Prithvi Zutshi  is an Indian film and television character actor. He is best known for his television roles of Sardar Vallabhbhai Patel in Pradhanmantri, Apaharan and Sahara One's Haunted Nights. He had mostly featured in almost all movies of director Vikram Bhatt.

Filmography

1993- Baazigar
1994- Drohkaal
1998- Ghulam
1999- Taal
2001- Kasoor
2002- Aap Mujhe Achche Lagne Lage
2003- Escape from Taliban
2003- Andaaz
2004- Aetbaar
2005- Elaan
2005- Apaharan
2005- Ek Khiladi Ek Haseena
2005- Garam Masala
2006-  The Killer
2009- Ruslaan
2010- Apni Yari Jaan Se Pyaari
2011- B&W The Black And White Fact
2011- Aashiqon Ka Jalna Buri Baat Hai
2012- Mere Aashiq
2015- Hate Story 3
2017-Monsoon Shootout

Television
 Shanti
 Abhay charan(1996) as sriman gour mohan dey
 Raja Ki Aayegi Baraat (2008) as Lawyer
 Savdhaan India as Politician Prakash Trivedi (Episode No 798)
 Haunted Nights
 Pradhanmantri as Sardar Vallabhbhai Patel 
 Shastri Sisters as Harishankar Pandey
 Adaalat
 Kaal Bhairav Rahasya as Sarpanch
Chandrashekhar as Sarkar
 Ishq Mein Marjawan as Aarohi's father
 Ek Boond Ishq as Ranveer Singh Shekhawat

References

External links
 
 

Indian male film actors
Indian male television actors
Indian male voice actors
Male actors in Hindi cinema
Living people
1937 births
Place of birth missing (living people)
20th-century Indian male actors
21st-century Indian male actors
Kashmiri Pandits
Indian people of Kashmiri descent